The Wicker Man is a series of two horror films directed by  British author and director Robin Hardy. The films are not directly linked to one another, but all deal with the theme of paganism in the modern world.

The 2006 American remake of The Wicker Man is not a part of the series, and Hardy had dissociated himself from it.

Films

The Wicker Man (1973) 

The Wicker Man was released in 1973. The film was directed by Robin Hardy and written by Anthony Shaffer, who based his screenplay loosely on the David Pinner novel Ritual.

The story follows a Scottish police officer, Sergeant Neil Howie (Edward Woodward), who visits the isolated island of Summerisle in the search for a missing girl named Rowan Morrison. The inhabitants of Summerisle all follow a form of Celtic paganism, which shocks and appalls the devoutly Christian sergeant. Howie discovers that the pagans, led by their laird, Lord Summerisle (Christopher Lee), are planning a virgin sacrifice in the hopes that it will appease the gods and restore their crops. Believing that Rowan Morrison will be sacrificed, Howie strives to rescue her, only to discover that her supposed disappearance was just a ploy to lure him to the island. The pagans imprison Howie in a wicker man and set it ablaze, burning him to death.

The Wicker Man is generally very highly regarded by critics. Film magazine Cinefantastique described it as "The Citizen Kane of Horror Movies", and in 2004 the magazine Total Film named The Wicker Man the sixth greatest British film of all time. It also won the 1978 Saturn Award for Best Horror Film. A scene from this film was #45 on Bravo's 100 Scariest Movie Moments.

The Wicker Tree (2011)
In 2006, Robin Hardy published a follow-up novel to The Wicker Man storyline entitled Cowboys for Christ. It follows two young Americans, Beth and Steve, who leave Texas to spread Christianity in Tressock, Scotland. They are welcomed by Sir Lachlan Morrison and his wife, Delia Morrison; unbeknown to Beth and Steve, they are in grave danger from a Celtic pagan community in the village.

A film adaptation, entitled The Wicker Tree, was produced in 2009, with Hardy directing from his own screenplay. It had a film festival showing in 2011. A limited theatrical release occurred in January 2012 in the U.S., followed by a DVD release in April 2012. It was the second highest ordered DVD on Amazon for the first three months after its release, a fact that director Robin Hardy was very proud of.

The Wrath of the Gods (unproduced)
The Wrath of the Gods was a planned romantic black comedy film written and to have been directed by Hardy, and based on Twilight of the Gods, the final part of Richard Wagner's Ring Cycle. In this film, "the gods get their comeuppance." Hardy announced plans for a trilogy in a 2007 interview with The Guardian newspaper, though the first film in the trilogy, The Wicker Man, was originally made in 1973, 34 years before. The third film was originally intended to be set primarily in Iceland; however, Hardy decided that filming there would be too impractical, and rewrote the script, re-setting the story in Shetland, with some scenes to be shot in Los Angeles. Since Shetland has a largely Scandinavian folklore rather than Celtic, this allows the story to remain focused on Norse mythology. Production status of the third film in the trilogy is unknown given Hardy's death on 1 July 2016.

Plot

The film is divided into two parts. The protagonists are a young couple, Siegfried and Brynne. Siegfried is handsome but "incredibly stupid", and he has been overtaken by his own hubris and sporting ability. Brynne loves him despite his flaws, and she succeeds in teaching him to make love in a "triumphal moment". Hardy said that the film is ultimately about "what happens to the gods, not just to the people who are offering sacrifices to them. The gods themselves get sucked into the mêlée in the third film. I looked for a suitable carapace to put that in and the last act of the Ring cycle seems to work very well – and it allows me to mix full-blast Wagner."

Another of the film's key characters is Brynne's father, a chief of police. He has a tragic romance with a middle-aged woman, who has been accused of murder in Canada. Hardy stated that the chief of police will have to turn her in because he is an honourable man.

The main antagonist of The Wrath of the Gods is Mr Odin, a one-eyed Hollywood studio executive who decides to create a theme park based on the Norse sagas which originated in Iceland.

Production
The Wrath of the Gods was originally intended to begin shooting in 2011, but was delayed. Filming was then intended to start in June or July 2012. The film was planned to be shot on 35mm film. Once the film's production was complete, Hardy planned for the sets to become a tourist attraction.

According to Hardy's 2011 casting announcements, Brynne will be played by Icelandic actress Hatla Williams. Mr Odin will be played by James Mapes, the actor who played Reverend Moriarty in Hardy's previous film, The Wicker Tree. Hardy intended to cast French actress Juliette Binoche as the murder suspect.

In a 2013 Q&A session at the University of Hertfordshire, at a special screening of The Wicker Man, Hardy confirmed that he intended to begin shooting in the middle of 2013.

In an interview the same year with ScreenDaily.com, ahead of the release of The Wicker Man: The Final Cut, Hardy stated that he was in the opening stages of financing the third film, and hoped to make it the following year.

Soundtrack
The film's score was written by Scottish composer Keith Easdale, and was inspired by Richard Wagner's compositions. Hardy wanted to find amusing ways to implement music in the film. Each of the characters will have their own theme: for example, Brynne will have a light melodic motif. Hardy compared this to Leonard Bernstein's work on West Side Story, where variations on a single melody were used to create many musical themes. Hardy was also inspired by the music of Shetland's Up Helly Aa fire festivals.

References

British horror films
English-language films
Horror film series
Paganism in Europe